Houston McTear (February 12, 1957 – November 1, 2015) was an American sprinter, who emerged from desperate poverty in the Florida Panhandle to become an international track star in the mid-1970s.

McTear rated in the top 10 in the 100 meters for the United States from 1975–1980, but he was stronger at shorter distances, including 60 meters. His 1978 world record in the 60 meters (6.54 s) stood up until it was broken by Ben Johnson in 1986. McTear ran a 6.38 in 1980, but that mark has been invalidated due to "questionable timing". If that time were to stand, it would still be the second best all time performance. However, his meteoric rise was effectively ended by the American-led boycott of the 1980 Summer Olympics.

Early promise
McTear was born in Okaloosa County, Florida. While at Baker High School in Baker, Florida, McTear won state titles in the 100 and 220 yards four times, the only Florida high school athlete ever to do so. He recorded a 9.0 mark in the 100-yard dash as a high schooler at the Florida AA High State Meet in the preliminary heats, in Winter Park, Florida, but the world record time was not recognized because it was hand-timed. The time remains the NFHS National High School record in the now discontinued event. He was the 1975 High School Athlete of the Year, as selected by Track and Field News.

At the 1976 U.S. Olympic Trials in Eugene, Oregon, McTear ran a 10.16 sec over 100 metres, at the time the fastest ever run under any condition by a Florida high school athlete. It is still No. 4 on the all-time list, only surpassed by Jeffery Demps and Marvin Bracy and Trayvon Bromell, all born well over a decade after McTear's performance.

International stardom
McTear qualified for the 1976 Summer Olympics in Montreal in the 100 meters, but an achilles tendon injury suffered in the Olympic Trials forced him to withdraw from the Olympic field. He was replaced by Johnny "Lam" Jones, who finished sixth. The American 4 x 100 meter relay team won the gold medal, led by McTear's rival Harvey Glance.

McTear appeared on the cover of Sports Illustrated in 1978, and qualified for the U.S. Olympic team in 1980, but the U.S. boycott of the 1980 Summer Olympics prevented his participation. From there he fell into drug use and was homeless for three years during the 1980s. He attempted a comeback in the early 1990s and won the 60 meters at the Swedish Indoor Championships in 1990 with a time of 6.68s.

Personal
McTear was married to the Swedish sprinter Linda Haglund. They lived in Sweden and owned a sports consulting business.

McTear died of lung cancer on November 1, 2015, aged 58, in Stockholm. He was survived by four children and his widow, Haglund, who died on November 21, 2015, only three weeks after McTear's death, also from cancer.

Rankings
McTear was ranked among the best in the world and the US in his event from 1975 to 1980, according to Track and Field News.

References

External links
Tribute site
Film site

1957 births
2015 deaths
People from Okaloosa County, Florida
American male sprinters
African-American male track and field athletes
Track and field athletes from Florida
Deaths from lung cancer
Deaths from cancer in Sweden
USA Indoor Track and Field Championships winners
20th-century African-American sportspeople
21st-century African-American people